St. Augustine Parish Church is the only Augustinian Roman Catholic church in Bay, Laguna, in the Philippines. The church was first administered by Augustinian friars and later transferred to the Franciscans.

History 

It is historically considered as the oldest Roman Catholic church in the Province of Laguna upon the early conquest and establishment of La Laguna.

The first church of Bay was constructed made of light material of bamboo and nipa by the first-ever Catholic missionaries in Laguna, the Augustinian friars of Provincia del Santisimo Nombre de Jesus. It was built along the shore of Laguna Lake (now Brgy. San Agustin.) The town church itself was under supervision of Prior provincial itself no other than Fray Martin de Rada (de Herada in some documents) under the patronage of the order's major patron St. Augustine in 1571. It became a parish on April 30, 1578. In the 18th century, the ecclesiastical administration of Bay was transferred to the Order of Franciscan Minors (OFM), with Father Domingo Martorel as its new parish priest on November 23, 1737. In 1804 a structure made of bricks and wood was built under the supervision of Fray Geronimo Hervas OFM. Construction of the church continued until the tenure of Fray Pedro Moya in 1864.

When the most devastating earthquakes in the Philippines struck in 1880, the Luzon earthquake, the church suffered some damage, including to the church's roof. The earthquake also led to a number of fatalities among the townspeople.

When the regular clergy (missionaries) abandoned the Philippines in 1898–1899 due to the Philippine Revolution against Spain and in 1899-1903 due to the Philippine–American War, the Bay church and convent were administered by the secular clergy of the Archdiocese of Manila. The church was also heavily damaged during the Japanese occupation of the Philippines and the Second World War from 1942 to 1945. When peacetime came in 1953, the church was gradually rebuilt by Father Alejandro Vermorel. When the Archdiocese of Lipa was created, the church was transferred to the newly created archdiocese as of April 16, 1967.
In 1980s the canonical administration of Bay Church was again transferred to the newly created Diocese of San Pablo.

Notes

Bibliography

External links 

Roman Catholic churches in Laguna (province)
Marked Historical Structures of the Philippines
1571 establishments in the Philippines
Churches in the Roman Catholic Diocese of San Pablo